Saxham may refer to:

Great Saxham, Suffolk
Little Saxham, Suffolk
Saxham and Risby railway station
Saxham Hall
The Saxhams
To Saxham. a poem written by Thomas Carew